Leavenworth is a neighborhood in the midtown region of Omaha, Nebraska. It is bounded by Harney Street to the north, 20th Street to the east, Leavenworth Street and Mason Street to the south, and Turner Boulevard to the west. Leavenworth is straddled by the Gerald R. Ford Expressway, roughly dividing the neighborhood into a business district in the east and a residential area in the west. The neighborhood is home to the Omaha Children's Museum, a popular attraction in the midtown area. Leavenworth is also home to the historic Mary Rogers Kimball House.

Amenities and facilities

Parks
 Dewey Park
 Turner Park in nearby Midtown Crossing

Schools
 Liberty Elementary School
 Jackson Elementary School
 Jackson Alternative Center
 St. Peter's School

Congregations
 Abundant Mercy Pentecostal Church
 Christian Science First Church
 First Baptist Church
 FLC Omaha
 St. Peter's Church

Clubs
YMCA of Greater Omaha

Governmental services
The United States Postal Service operates a post office adjacent to the Leavenworth neighborhood on Leavenworth Street.

References

Neighborhoods in Omaha, Nebraska